The Third Battle of Ramla (or Ramleh) took place on 27 August 1105 between the Crusader Kingdom of Jerusalem and the Fatimids of Egypt. The town of Ramla lay on the road from Jerusalem to Ascalon, the latter of which was the largest Fatimid fortress in Palestine. From Ascalon the Fatimid vizier, Al-Afdal Shahanshah, launched almost annual attacks into the newly founded Crusader kingdom from 1099 to 1107. Of the three battles the Crusaders fought at Ramla early in the twelfth century, the third was the most bloody.

Egyptian armies of the period relied on masses of Sudanese bowmen supported by Arab and Berber cavalry. Since the archers were on foot and the horsemen awaited attack with lance and sword, an Egyptian army provided exactly the sort of immobile target that the Frankish heavy cavalry excelled in attacking. Whereas the Crusaders developed a healthy respect for the harass and surround tactics of the Turkish horse archers, they tended to discount the effectiveness of the Egyptian armies. While overconfidence led to a Crusader disaster at the second battle of Ramla, the more frequent result was a Fatimid defeat. "The Franks never, until the reign of Saladin, feared the Egyptian as they did the armies from Muslim Syria and Mesopotamia."

As at Ramla in 1101, in 1105 the Crusaders had both cavalry and infantry under the leadership of Baldwin I. At the third battle, however, the Egyptians were reinforced by a Seljuk Turkish force from Damascus, including mounted archery, the great menace of the Crusaders. After they withstood the initial Frankish cavalry charge the battle raged for most of the day. Although Baldwin was once again able to drive the Egyptians from the field of battle and loot the enemy camp he was unable to pursue them any further: "the Franks appear to have owed their victory to the activity of Baldwin. He vanquished the Turks when they were becoming a serious threat to his rear, and returned to the main battle to lead the decisive charge which defeated the Egyptians." Despite the victory the Egyptians continued to make annual raids into the Kingdom of Jeruselum with some reaching the walls of Jerusalem itself before being pushed back. The next major engagement between Fatimids and Crusaders was the Battle of Yibneh in 1123.

Citations

Bibliography

 
 
 
 Barber, Malcolm. The Crusader States. Yale University Press, 2012. 
 

Battles involving the Kingdom of Jerusalem
Battles involving the Fatimid Caliphate
Conflicts in 1105
1105 in Asia
History of Ramla
1100s in the Kingdom of Jerusalem
Crusader–Fatimid wars